Bathyphylax is a genus of spikefishes native to the deep waters of the Indian and Pacific Oceans.

Species
There are currently three recognized species in this genus:
 Bathyphylax bombifrons G. S. Myers, 1934 (Boomer spikefish)
 Bathyphylax omen J. C. Tyler, 1966
 Bathyphylax pruvosti Santini, 2006

References

Tetraodontiformes
Marine fish families
Taxa named by George S. Myers